Igor Ursachi (born 7 July 1962) is a retired Moldovan football player, who currently is coaching the Moldova U–21 football team.

Honours
Azerbaijan Top League 2006-07 with Khazar Lankaran
2006–07 Azerbaijan Cup with Khazar Lankaran
2011–12 Moldovan "B" Division with Veris Chișinău

References

External links
 
 
 
 Игорь Урсаки – Кубок Содружества 2015
 

1962 births
Living people
Footballers from Chișinău
Moldovan footballers
CSF Bălți managers
Association football midfielders
Moldovan football managers
Moldovan Super Liga players
Moldovan Super Liga managers
FC Dacia Chișinău managers